Theodorick Bland (January 16, 1629 – April 23, 1671), also known as Theodorick Bland of Westover, was a planter, merchant and politician in colonial Virginia.

Early and family life
Born in London, he served as his family's business agent in Spain and the Canary Islands while in his early twenties.  He moved to the colony of Virginia in 1653, to replace his brother Edward, who had died.

Bland was one of sixteen children, and the youngest of nine sons, born to John and Susan Bland. He married Anna Bennett, the daughter of Governor Richard Bennett, and they had three sons:
Theodorick Bland (born 1663); he married Margaret Man and had two sons, John and Theodorick.
Richard Bland (born August 11, 1665); he married twice. His first wife Mary Swan bore seven children, who all died as children. After Mary's death, Bland married Elizabeth Randolph, the daughter of burgess William Randolph I.  The couple had five children including Richard Bland II and Theodorick Bland of Cawsons.
John Bland (born February 8, 1668); also married twice. He first married Mary Breckon, then remarried and had at least three children with his second wife, Elizabeth Dale: Richard, John (who was the grandfather of Chancellor Theodorick Bland), and Anna. John returned to England, settled in Scarborough, North Yorkshire and was responsible for the construction of Bland's Cliff.

Other Bland descendants include Roger Atkinson Pryor.

Career
Bland initially lived in Charles City County, whose voters elected him as one of their representatives in the 1660 House of Burgesses session, where fellow members elected him as Speaker. Thus Bland presided over the legislature during the transition from the Cromwell Protectorate to the restored government of Charles II. He served on the Governor's Council 1664–71, and also represented newly formed Henrico County in the House of Burgesses from 1661 until his death, probably in 1672.

In 1665, Sir John Pawlett, by deeds of lease and release, demised most of Westover Plantation to Bland for £170.

Death and legacy
Bland lived at Westover, where he died in 1671 or 1672 and was buried in the chancel of the original Westover Church (which he had built). His eldest son, Theodorick, inherited the land and joined his brother, Richard, in operating that plantation. The brothers eventually conveyed 1,200 acres of the property to William Byrd I in 1688 for £300 and 10,000 pounds of tobacco and cask. Although the church was moved from its original location, Bland remains buried in the graveyard near Walter Aston and Captain William Perry.

In November 1687, Bland's wife, Anna, died in Wharton Creek, Maryland. They had given rise to the "Bland family" which became one of the First Families of Virginia.

Notes

References

External links
 
 Theodorick Bland at Encyclopedia Virginia

1629 births
1671 deaths
Theodorick
People from Charles City County, Virginia
People from Henrico County, Virginia
Speakers of the Virginia House of Burgesses
Virginia Governor's Council members
Politicians from London
English emigrants
American planters
American slave owners